Anthony John Travia (February 26, 1911 – December 7, 1993) was a United States district judge of the United States District Court for the Eastern District of New York.

Education and career

Born in Milwaukee, Wisconsin, Travia received a Bachelor of Laws from St. John's University School of Law in 1932. He was in private practice of law in New York from 1933 to 1968. He was a Member of the New York State Assembly from 1943 to 1946 and from 1948 to 1968.

State assembly and other political service

On November 2, 1943, he was elected as a Democrat to the New York State Assembly (Kings Co., 22nd D.), to fill the vacancy caused by the resignation of James A. Corcoran. He was re-elected in 1944, and remained in the Assembly until 1946, sitting in the 164th and 165th New York State Legislatures.

Travia was again a member of the State Assembly from 1949 to 1968, sitting in the 167th, 168th, 169th, 170th, 171st, 172nd, 173rd, 174th, 175th, 176th and 177th New York State Legislatures; and was Minority Leader from 1959 to 1964, and Speaker of the New York State Assembly from 1965 to 1968. He was President of the New York State Constitutional Convention of 1967.

Notable legislation

Travia is the author of Travia Leave, Law 3107 of the NYS Education Law, which specifies that public employees who are members of a retirement system "…shall upon application be granted a retirement leave with full pay consisting of one half of their accumulated unused sick leave up to a maximum of one semester."

Federal judicial service

Travia was nominated by President Lyndon B. Johnson on April 25, 1968, to a seat on the United States District Court for the Eastern District of New York vacated by Judge Matthew T. Abruzzo. He was confirmed by the United States Senate on June 24, 1968, and received his commission on July 17, 1968. His service was terminated on November 30, 1974, due to his resignation.

Post judicial service and death

Following his resignation from the federal bench, Travia returned to the private practice of law in New York until his death. He died on December 7, 1993, at the Vassar Brothers Medical Center in Poughkeepsie, New York.

Personal

In 1935, Travia married Rita A. Sorrentino and they had two sons.

References

Further reading
 Profile at the Federal Judicial Center
 Explanation of Travia Leave from CUNY Professional Staff Congress

1911 births
1993 deaths
American people of Italian descent
Speakers of the New York State Assembly
Democratic Party members of the New York State Assembly
Lawyers from Milwaukee
St. John's University School of Law alumni
Judges of the United States District Court for the Eastern District of New York
United States district court judges appointed by Lyndon B. Johnson
20th-century American judges
Politicians from Brooklyn
20th-century American lawyers
Politicians from Milwaukee